Mark Petersen is a New Zealand rock guitarist from Auckland. He replaced guitarist Andrew Brough in Straitjacket Fits in 1991. Petersen played on their Done EP and final album Blow and toured with the band until they broke up in February 1994. Petersen continued on playing guitar and singing with his 'Cabbage Bomber' but is best remembered for his bass and guitar work in Bob Cardy's ['Shaft']. He played guitar and sang on the Straitjacket Fits 2005 reunion tour of New Zealand. He had previously been a member of Dunedin Band Working With Walt. In 2008 he was inducted into the New Zealand Music Hall of Fame with the rest of Straitjacket Fits. He now records and performs under the pseudonym 'Seeds Of Orbit'.

Awards

Aotearoa Music Awards
The Aotearoa Music Awards (previously known as New Zealand Music Awards (NZMA)) are an annual awards night celebrating excellence in New Zealand music and have been presented annually since 1965.

! 
|-
| 2008 || Mark Petersen (as part of Straitjacket Fits) || New Zealand Music Hall of Fame ||  || 
|-

References

New Zealand rock musicians
Living people
Year of birth missing (living people)
Dunedin Sound musicians
Straitjacket Fits members
Musicians from Auckland